Alfred Cumming (January 30, 1829 – December 5, 1910) was a brigadier general for the Confederacy in the American Civil War.

Early life
Born in Augusta, Georgia, he was the son of Henry Harford Cumming, a cotton magnate, and Julia Ann (Bryan) Cumming. At twenty, he graduated from West Point, ranking 35th in his class of 43. In the prewar United States Army, he served mainly in the West, including two years in Louisiana as an aide to Brig. Gen. David E. Twiggs. Later he accompanied Albert Sidney Johnston's expedition to Utah Territory, where he aided his uncle, Alfred Cumming (the Governor of Utah) in the Utah War.

Civil War

In January 1861, he resigned a captaincy in the 10th United States Infantry to accept the Lieutenant Colonelcy of the Augusta Volunteer Battalion. He soon resigned that position to become major of the 1st Georgia Infantry. By June, he was the Lieutenant Colonel of the 10th Georgia Infantry Regiment and four months later its colonel, succeeding Lafayette McLaws. He served with distinction during the Peninsula Campaign of 1862, including the Battle of Yorktown, the Battle of Savage's Station, and the Battle of Malvern Hill, where he was wounded. His performance earned him the temporary command of an Alabama brigade prior to the Maryland Campaign due to the illness of Brigadier General Cadmus M. Wilcox.

On September 14, 1862, Cumming's brigade came up quickly to support troops under Brig. Gen. Howell Cobb, forced back from Crampton's Gap by a Federal offensive. His promptness helped keep the Union advance from its objective, Harpers Ferry. He was awarded a brigadier general's star six weeks later. Afterward, Cumming went west: first to Mobile, then in April 1863 to Mississippi as a subordinate to Lt. Gen. John C. Pemberton. He led a brigade in Maj. Gen. Carter L. Stevenson's division at Champion's Hill and in the actions outside Vicksburg. Captured and paroled with the city's garrison, he reorganized Stevenson's old brigade at Decatur, Georgia, in the fall of 1863 and led it gallantly at Missionary Ridge.

He was conspicuous in many actions during the Atlanta Campaign, winning praise for several successful and unsuccessful attacks. At Jonesboro, he was disabled by another wound.

Postbellum
In postwar years, he farmed in Floyd County, Georgia before moving to Rome, Georgia, and then to his native city.

Cumming died in Rome, Georgia, and was buried in Summerville Cemetery.

See also

 List of American Civil War generals (Confederate)

Notes

References
 Eicher, John H., and David J. Eicher, Civil War High Commands. Stanford: Stanford University Press, 2001. .
 Sifakis, Stewart. Who Was Who in the Civil War. New York: Facts On File, 1988. .
 Warner, Ezra J. Generals in Gray: Lives of the Confederate Commanders. Baton Rouge: Louisiana State University Press, 1959. .

External links

Letter from Alfred Cumming to Stephen D. Lee

1829 births
1910 deaths
People from Augusta, Georgia
United States Military Academy alumni
United States Army officers
Confederate States Army brigadier generals
People of Georgia (U.S. state) in the American Civil War
Farmers from Georgia (U.S. state)
American Civil War prisoners of war